Moon Township, Beaver County, Pennsylvania is an extinct township in western Pennsylvania.

History

Moon Township was created in 1812 when the area in Beaver County south of the Ohio River was reorganized from three into four townships.

Over the years, communities were formed from Moon Township: Raccoon Township in 1837, Phillipsburg Borough in 1840 (now Monaca), and Potter Township in 1912.

In 1914, a serious dispute among Moon Township residents split the township, separating the heavily populated suburban section in the north from the much larger sparsely populated region in the south and west. On November 24, 1914, after a second election, the court decreed that the larger southern section be known as Center Township. Eighteen years later, the remaining portion of Moon in the north was annexed by Monaca, becoming that borough's Fourth and Fifth Wards (Monaca Heights and Colona Heights).

References

Former townships in Pennsylvania
1812 establishments in Pennsylvania
1930s disestablishments in Pennsylvania
Townships in Beaver County, Pennsylvania